Mariasundet is a sound in Nathorst Land at the mouth of Van Mijenfjorden at Spitsbergen, Svalbard; between Mariaholmen and Måseneset. While Akselsundet is regarded as the main entrance into Van Mijenfjorden, Mariasundet is also navigable. It contains the three sherries Svarten, Veslesvarten and Erta.

References

Straits of Svalbard
Landforms of Spitsbergen